The Speedball 14 is an American sailing dinghy that was designed by W. Shad Turner and first built in 1980.

Production
The design was built by Laguna Yachts in the United States, starting in 1980, but it is now out of production.

Design
The Speedball 14 is a recreational sailboat, built predominantly of fiberglass. It has a fractional sloop rig, a raked stem, a plumb transom, a transom-hung rudder controlled by a tiller and a retractable centerboard. It displaces .

See also
List of sailing boat types

References

External links
Photo of a Speedball 14

Dinghies
1980s sailboat type designs
Sailboat type designs by W. Shad Turner
Sailboat types built by Laguna Yachts